Jagger House is a historic home located at Westhampton in Suffolk County, New York. The house has two main components: the original, three-bay, -story section with a gambrel roof built about 1748, and a large 19th-century addition with a gable roof.  At the rear are two wooden shed additions.

It was added to the National Register of Historic Places in 1978.

References

External links
Jagger House (StoppingPoints.com)

Houses on the National Register of Historic Places in New York (state)
Houses in Suffolk County, New York
National Register of Historic Places in Suffolk County, New York